The General Labour Confederation of Belgium (BVV; , CGTB) was a socialist national trade union federation in Belgium active between 1937 and 1944 when it was superseded by the General Labour Federation of Belgium.

History
The federation was established on 5 December 1937, as a replacement for the Trade Union Commission.  It was more centralised than its predecessor, and was not formally linked with the Belgian Labour Party.  By 1939, it had about 540,000 members, making it the largest trade union federation in the country.

After 1940, it briefly operated under the German occupation, with new leadership who disavowed class struggle, but was banned completely later in the year.

Much of the trade union movement took part in the Belgian Resistance.  Some tried to operate underground, while some leaders formed the Belgian Trade Union Centre in London.  On 29 April 1945, with the occupation ended, the BVV was officially merged with the communist Belgian Federation of Unity Syndicates and the Unified Trade Unions, to form the General Labour Federation of Belgium.

Affiliates

Leadership

Presidents
1937: Edward De Vlamynck
1940: Joseph Bondas

General Secretaries
1937: Joseph Bondas
1939: Joseph Bondas and Jef Rens
1940: Jef Rens

References

Trade unions in Belgium
1937 establishments in Belgium
Trade unions established in 1937
Trade unions disestablished in 1945
National federations of trade unions
1945 disestablishments in Belgium